Benjamin Robert Vincent Fenton (28 October 1918 – 29 July 2000) was an English professional football player and manager. He played for West Ham United, Millwall, Charlton Athletic and Colchester United, making over 400 appearances in the Football League for all four clubs. He managed Colchester United, Leyton Orient and spent eight years at Millwall, before holding various positions at Charlton Athletic.

Career

Playing career
Fenton represented West Ham, Essex and London as a schoolboy. He signed for Colchester Town in 1934, moving to West Ham United a year later. Fenton served in the same Territorial Army unit as his West Ham teammates and played mainly as outside-left with the east London club.

He made his professional debut for West Ham United on 9 October 1937, playing alongside his older brother Ted, as an inside forward in a match against Fulham. He played three times that season, and managed nine goals in his eighteen games in 1938–39. The two brothers played together in the same team on four occasions, the only brothers to do so at first team level for West Ham. Fenton was not retained by the club and joined Millwall in March 1939, where he was utilised as a wing half.

Fenton joined the Essex Regiment during the Second World War. He guested for former club West Ham United in November 1944, and also played for Norwich City, Manchester City, Charlton Athletic, Crystal Palace, York City, and Cardiff City as a wartime guest.

Fenton never gained full international honours, but toured South Africa with the FA in 1939, making three appearances, and also represented an FA Services XI team against Switzerland on 24 July 1945.

Fenton joined Charlton Athletic of the First Division in January 1947. He became club captain in the 1950–51 season, and made 264 League appearances at inside forward and wing half during his nine seasons with the club, before leaving in February 1955.

Coaching career

In 1955, Fenton joined Third Division South club Colchester United as player-manager and switched to defensive duties. He played his first game for the club on 5 March 1955, a home match against Brentford that the U's won 3–2. He narrowly missed out on success in the 1956–57 campaign, after finishing a single point behind both Ipswich Town and Torquay United. He played on into the 1957–58 season, playing his final game for the club on 1 May 1958, a 4–2 home win against Southampton, aged 39 years, 185 days. Colchester United finished 12th in the 1957–58 Third Division South campaign, thereby earning the right to compete in the newly merged Third Division the following season. After relegation in 1960–61, he led the team to promotion after finishing as Fourth Division runners-up in 1961–62.

Fenton joined Leyton Orient as manager on 1 November 1963. He was sacked after 56 games in charge in December 1964.

He went on to take the manager role at Millwall on 1 May 1966, towards the end of the 1965–66 season. The season saw the south London club win promotion to Division Two (the club's second promotion in succession), and the club would set a record of 59 home League games unbeaten in December 1966. Millwall spent the rest of Fenton's tenure in England's second tier; the closest the Lions came to promotion under Fenton was in 1972, with a point separating them from second-place Birmingham City. He left the club on 3 October 1974, as the club's longest serving post-war manager.

In January 1977, he rejoined Charlton as secretary. He became assistant manager of the Addicks in March 1980 and progressed to the position of general manager in June 1981. He stayed in with the club until June 1982.

Managerial statistics

Outside football
Fenton also played lawn bowls for Essex County. He married wife Winnie on Christmas Day 1939, with whom he had one daughter, two grandchildren and one great grandchild. In later life, he lived in Dorset, where he died, aged 81.

References

External links

The Book of Football 1972 – The Beginning of No One Likes Us, millwall-history.org.uk

1918 births
2000 deaths
Military personnel from Essex
Footballers from West Ham
English footballers
Association football midfielders
British Army personnel of World War II
Essex Regiment soldiers
Colchester Town F.C. players
West Ham United F.C. players
Millwall F.C. players
Charlton Athletic F.C. players
Colchester United F.C. players
English Football League players
Norwich City F.C. wartime guest players
Manchester City F.C. wartime guest players
Cardiff City F.C. wartime guest players
Charlton Athletic F.C. wartime guest players
Crystal Palace F.C. wartime guest players
West Ham United F.C. wartime guest players
York City F.C. wartime guest players
English football managers
Colchester United F.C. managers
Leyton Orient F.C. managers
Millwall F.C. managers
English Football League managers
Charlton Athletic F.C. non-playing staff